Oratag or Oratağ or Horrat’agh, or Horatagh may refer to:
Aşağı Oratağ, Azerbaijan
Yuxarı Oratag, Azerbaijan